GeoSouthern Energy Corporation is a petroleum and natural gas exploration and production company headquartered in The Woodlands, Texas.

History
In 1981, the company was founded by George Bishop.

In February 2014, the company sold 82,000 acres in the Eagle Ford shale area of Texas to Devon Energy for $6 billion in cash. The assets were owned in a joint venture with a fund of The Blackstone Group.

In May 2015, the second phase of development at GeoSouthern's corporate campus, Wildwood Corporate Centre, at The Woodlands started, including relocating two 100-year-old 60 feet tall oak trees.

In August 2015, in partnership with GSO Capital Partners, the company acquired assets in the Haynesville Shale, including 300 wells across 112,000 acres, from Encana for $850 million.

References

Oil companies of the United States
Natural gas companies of the United States
Companies based in The Woodlands, Texas
Non-renewable resource companies established in 1981